Major-General Jeremy Michael Spencer-Smith  (28 July 1917 – 1985) was a British Army officer.

Military career
Educated at Eton College and New College, Oxford, Spencer-Smith was commissioned into the Welsh Guards on 4 July 1940 during the Second World War. He became commander of 148th Infantry Brigade in March 1964, Deputy Director of Manning at the Ministry of Defence in April 1967 and General Officer Commanding Wales in April 1968. He went on to become Director of Manning at the Ministry of Defence in June 1970 before retiring in June 1972.

References

 

1917 births
Officers of the Order of the British Empire
Recipients of the Military Cross
British Army generals
Welsh Guards officers
People educated at Eton College
Alumni of New College, Oxford
1985 deaths
British Army personnel of World War II